The sixth season of Law & Order: Criminal Intent premiered on NBC September 19, 2006, and ended May 21, 2007; this was the last season to air original episodes on NBC.

This season of Law & Order: CI premiered in the NBC Tuesday 9/8c time slot as a lead-in for episodes of Law & Order: Special Victims Unit; NBC had acquired the rights to Sunday Night Football for the 2006–2007 season. For its first six airings, it faced CBS's The Unit and baseball on Fox. In late October, Fox's hit series House moved opposite L&O: CI. It was hoped that the show could maintain second position, beating the then-marginal The Unit, but that did not occur.

The show's ratings suffered a steep drop and it regularly finished fourth in its time slot. By the end of the season, Law & Order: CI saw its lowest ratings ever on NBC, the episodes "Endgame" and "Renewal" being shifted to originally air on Monday nights. 

This is the last season the original hard rock theme song was used in the opening sequence before changing to the fast-paced theme song of the now-defunct related series Law & Order: Trial by Jury – coinciding with the show's move to USA Network in Fall 2007.

Cast and crew changes
It was announced that Jamey Sheridan wanted to depart the cast at the end of the fifth season. Sheridan's Captain Deakins retires from the Major Case Squad starting with the episode "On Fire," rather than battle a conspiracy to frame him instigated by former Chief of Detectives Frank Adair (Michael Rispoli), whom Major Case detectives have arrested for killing a female acquaintance and her husband.

Courtney B. Vance who portrayed Assistant District Attorney Ron Carver decided not to renew his contract at the end of the fifth season, which resulted in his character being written out.  It was the same with Annabella Sciorra, who portrayed Mike Logan's partner Detective Barek; there were no reasons cited for Sciorra's departure.

Stars Vincent D'Onofrio, Kathryn Erbe, and Chris Noth returned for the sixth season as Eric Bogosian joined the cast as Captain Daniel Ross, Deakins' successor, who is a more by-the-book commanding officer, often getting in conflict with Detectives Goren and Logan. Julianne Nicholson also joined the cast as Detective Megan Wheeler, replacing Carolyn Barek as Logan's partner. Nicholson left the series temporarily to go on maternity leave at the end of the season.

Show runner René Balcer and executive producer Fred Berner left the show at the end of season five, Balcer and Berner returning to the original Law & Order series, which was slowly falling in the ratings. CI was handed off to Warren Leight, a longtime Criminal Intent staffer. Under Leight's leadership, the show acquired a new, more melodramatic tone.

"This is a different CI this season – there will be politics and more at stake emotionally and personally for our detectives," says Warren Leight, "We'll see more character-oriented stories, we want to give characters a larger role going forward and see the effect and sense the toll this job takes on the officers. Detective Goren isn't always going to be the smartest guy in the room anymore." 

The mystery aspect of the show was simplified in favor of more personal stories involving the detectives. For example, Goren endured his mother's long battle with cancer, culminating with her death in the episode "Endgame." Also, Logan's anger issues often come and go in episodes like "Maltese Cross," "Flipped," and "Renewal."

The show's look and editing style also changed in an effort to attract viewers of the newer CSI franchise. Norberto Barba replaced Fred Berner as executive producer. The scene cards and sound effect were not used in this season; they were brought back as of the ninth season.

Cast

Primary cast
 Vincent D'Onofrio as Detective Robert Goren - alternating with Chris Noth (Episodes 1, 3, 5, 6, 8, 12, 13, 15, 18, 19 & 21)
 Kathryn Erbe as Detective Alexandra Eames - alternating with Julianne Nicholson (Main credit episodes 1, 3, 5, 6, 8, 12, 13, 15, 18, 19, 21, Recurring credit episode 22)
 Chris Noth as Detective Mike Logan - alternating with Vincent D'Onofrio (Episodes 2, 4, 7, 9–11, 14, 16, 17, 20 & 22)
 Julianne Nicholson as Detective Megan Wheeler - alternating with Kathryn Erbe (Episodes 2, 4, 7, 9–11, 14, 16, 17, 20, 22)
 Eric Bogosian as Captain Danny Ross
note: some episodes aired in an order different from "production code" order, resulting in consecutive weeks of Goren/Eames or Logan/Wheeler

Recurring cast
 Leslie Hendrix as Elizabeth Rodgers
 Theresa Randle as Assistant District Attorney Patricia Kent
 Geneva Carr as News Reporter Faith Yancy
 Tony Goldwyn as Frank Goren
 Bridget Regan as ADA Claudia Shankly
 Neal Jones as NYPD Chief of Detectives Bradshaw

Guest stars
Martha Plimpton guest stars in the season premiere episode "Blind Spot" as Jo Gage, the serial killing daughter of Detective Goren's former mentor, Dr. Declan Gage, who is portrayed by John Glover. Plimpton's cousin, Ever Carradine, guest stars in the later episode, "Bombshell."

Anne Dudek portrays a teacher named Danielle McCaskin, who falls madly in love with her student, Keith Tyler (Anton Yelchin), after regrettably having sex with his father in the episode "Tru Love."

In "Siren Call," Brooke Shields portrays Kelly Sloane-Raines, a rich supermodel whose husband is believed to be involved in the murder of a small-town police officer's daughter.

Rip Torn guest stars as Jules Copeland in "Bedfellows," the wealthy and snide father of a wealthy and prominent historian.

Liza Minnelli guest stars as Beth Harner, a grieving mother who might get closure as a suspect is found that might have been involved in her daughter's brutal murder on Halloween night in the 1990s. The episode "Masquerade" revealed many resemblances to the case of JonBenét Ramsey, a six-year-old girl made famous by her unsolved murder and subsequent media coverage. 

Fran Drescher and Michael Biehn portray Elaine and Leland Dockerty, a couple whose military daughter disappears over Thanksgiving after she comes home from a tour of duty. Leland Dockerty was the Deputy Commissioner of the NYPD. Rita Moreno also guest stars in "The War at Home" as Detective Robert Goren's mother, Frances, who has fallen ill from dealing with her cancer; she later returns in the Goren/Eames team season finale episode "Endgame," where she succumbs to her cancer shortly after Goren brings up his paternity.

Matt Keeslar guest stars in "Blasters" as TV celebrity Willie "Kirk" Tunis, whose old screen friend is murdered by some mobsters.

Michelle Trachtenberg portrays Lisa Willow Tyler in "Weeping Willow," a girl who is kidnapped during the middle of her web show broadcast. The story and the WeepingWillow17 character were inspired by the lonelygirl15 video blogs on YouTube, which were originally believed to be the works of a real-life 15-year-old blogger, but were eventually discovered to be a professionally filmed hoax.

Maulik Pancholy plays Dani Hasni in the episode "World's Fair", where his younger sister is initially believed to have been murdered as the victim of a hate crime. The detectives later discover that Dani was the one who committed the murder because she shamed their family.

Doris Roberts guest stars as Virginia Harrington, the ill mother of an aristocratic New York family; she almost dies until Detectives Goren and Eames discover she's been mistreated by her family.

In "Albatros", Donna Murphy and Xander Berkeley guest star as George and Maureen Pagolis, a political couple that has some involvement in the murder of a judge during a reenactment of the Alexander Hamilton/Aaron Burr duel. Mike Colter also guest stars as the Pagolis's driver, Dave Oldren. 

Fab Five Freddy guest stars in the opening of the episode "Flipped" as rapper Fulla-T who is killed on the streets. Kirk "Sticky Fingaz" Jones portrays gang-unit Detective Harry Williams, who quickly turns from lead investigator to lead suspect in Fulla-T's murder. Aunjanue Ellis portrays Carmen Rivera, the girlfriend of Fulla-T who refuses to "snitch" to the police on who killed him.

Tony Goldwyn guest stars in "Brother's Keeper" as Detective Goren's brother Frank, who is first seen homeless, and possibly high, on the streets; Goren gives him his coat and a few dollars. Goldwyn returns in the Goren/Eames finale episode "Endgame" where their mother Frances is still suffering from cancer.

Lee Tergesen guest stars as Josh Lemle, an old friend of Detective Logan's who is a popular journalist. It is discovered that someone used Polonium-210 to poison Lemle, but he is reluctant to reveal the whole story to Logan because not all of it is pretty. John Dossett portrays Judge Nicholas Fenner Sr.; his son is murdered as soon as he put a rapper whom his son idolized in prison.

Bill O'Brien guest stars in "Silencer" as Detective Peter Lyons, a detective who can read sign language and translate it into spoken words.

Tate Donovan guest stars in "Rocket Man" as Commander Luke Nelson, the professional rival and ex-boyfriend of a murdered astronaut with whom he was having an affair.

In "Bombshell," Kristy Swanson portrays Lorelai Mailer, a woman whose son dies after she gives birth, only to die herself days later; the case becomes a homicide investigation that seems to involve the paternity of the newborn. The episode revealed many resemblances with the deaths of Anna Nicole Smith and her son Daniel Wayne Smith, which, like this episode, is a story with characters motivated by the misadventures of rich and famous people.

Roy Scheider guest stars as serial killer Mark Ford Brady in "Endgame;" Goren becomes irritable as he deals with Brady's near-end confessions and his mother's (Rita Moreno) cancer, but it turns out the two are connected. Mark Linn-Baker returns briefly as Wally Stevens, as an unwitting conduit between Goren and Brady, who is in the same penitentiary.

In the season finale "Renewal," Kelli Williams guest stars as Logan's neighbor and possible girlfriend, Holly Lauren. But when she turns up dead, it drives Logan mad to the point where he stops focusing on the case at hand—a police recruit's murder—and focuses instead on Lauren's death, which may have possibly been a suicide.

Brooke Tansley guest stars as Belle Duffy, a girl who follows in Nicole Wallace's (Olivia d'Abo, who doesn't appear in the episode) footsteps. Kathryn Erbe (Detective Alex Eames) guest stars in the episode to help Detective Wheeler close the police recruit's murder case.

Episodes

References

 

 

Law & Order: Criminal Intent episodes
2006 American television seasons
2007 American television seasons